The Walls Are Way Too Thin is the second extended play (EP) by English singer-songwriter Holly Humberstone. It was released on 5 November 2021, by Interscope Records.

Release
On 5 August 2021, Holly Humberstone announced the release of her second EP The Walls Are Way Too Thin alongside co-writer Matty Healy (The 1975).

Critical reception
The Walls Are Way Too Thin was met with widespread critical acclaim from critics. At Metacritic, which assigns a weighted average rating out of 100 to reviews from mainstream publications, this release received an average score of 86 based on 4 reviews, which indicates “universal acclaim”.

In a review for Gigwise, writer Harrison Smith wrote: "Humberstone dives headfirst into first-person narratives, romantic woes and poignant self-discovery on this latest offering. The charming lyrical honesty, infectious groove and playful energy throughout make The Walls Are Way Too Thin a coltish example of Humberstone's dynamic talent and spirit. At Under the Radar, Andy Von Pip said: "The Walls Are Way Too Thin EP provides proof positive that Humberstone is perhaps the brightest Gen Z singer/songwriter to emerge from the U.K. in quite some time. The EP deals with a sense of displacement, of messy relationships, of things falling apart, both physically and emotionally, and attempting to move on whilst trying to find your place in the world."

Track listing

Charts

References

External links
 
 

2021 EPs
Interscope Records albums